The Pacific Rim Tour was a concert tour of arenas and stadiums by American Pop/R&B singer Whitney Houston. The tour included 10 concert dates in Japan, Taiwan, Thailand, Australia and United States in 1997. The tour was in support of her 1996 multi-platinum album, The Preacher's Wife.

Opening act
Bobby Brown

Setlist
 "I'm Every Woman"
 "So Emotional"
 "I Wanna Dance with Somebody (Who Loves Me)"
 Medley: "All at Once" / "Saving All My Love for You" / "Greatest Love of All"
 "Queen of the Night"
 "Change the World" 
 "My Name Is Not Susan"
 "All the Man That I Need"
 "A Song for You" 
 "Exhale (Shoop Shoop)"
 "Freeway of Love"
 "Count On Me"  
 "In Return"  
 "I Love the Lord"
 "I Go to the Rock"
 "My Prerogative" 
 "I Will Always Love You"
 "Step by Step"
 "Something in Common" 

Notes

Personnel
Band
Musical director – Rickey Minor 
Bass guitar, bass synthesizer – Rickey Minor
Keyboards – Bette Sussman
Trumpet – Raymond Brown
Keyboards – Wayne Linsey
Drums: Michael Baker
Percussion – Bashiri Johnson
Guitars – Paul Jackson Jr.
Saxophone, EWI – Gary Bias
Trombone – Reginald Young
Backing vocalists – Gary Houston, Pattie Howard, Sharlotte Gibson, Valerie Pinkston-Mayo

Dancers 
Carolyn Brown, Merlyn Mitchell, Shane Johnson, Saleema Mubaarak

Tour Management
Manager – Tony Bulluck

Security
Director of Security – Alan Jacobs

Shows

Cancellations and rescheduled shows

Classic Whitney Live
Houston performed two special concerts, billed as "Classic Whitney Live from Washington, D.C." at the historic DAR Constitution Hall in Washington D.C. Whitney performed a few of her greatest hits, as well as gospel favorites and songs saluting some of her influences including Dionne Warwick, Aretha Franklin and Diana Ross. The second concert on October 5 was broadcast live on HBO cable channel TV. Whitney and The Whitney Houston Foundation for Children donated the proceeds, over $300,000 from ticket sales to the Children's Defense Fund, a national non-profit organization devoted to providing a voice for all children of America, particularly poor, minority and disabled children.

Set list
 "I Will Always Love You"
 "I Know Him So Well" 
 Dionne Warwick Medley: "Walk On By" / "A House Is Not a Home" / "I Say a Little Prayer" / "Alfie"
 Aretha Franklin Medley: "Baby I Love You" / "(Sweet Sweet Baby) Since You've Been Gone" / "Ain't No Way"
 Tribute to Sammy Davis Jr.: "Mr. Bojangles" 
 Tribute to United States great men: "Abraham, Martin and John"
 Diana Ross Medley: "God Bless The Child" / "Endless Love"  / "Ain't No Mountain High Enough" / "The Boss" / "Missing You" 
 Tribute to George Gershwin: "I Loves You, Porgy" / "Porgy, I's Your Woman Now" / "Summertime"
 "Exhale (Shoop Shoop)" 
 "I Love the Lord" 
 "I Go to the Rock"
 "The Greatest Love of All" 
 "Amazing Grace" 
 "Step by Step"
 "I'm Every Woman"

Notes

Shows

Box office score data

References

External links
 pacific rim tour – whitneyhouston

Whitney Houston concert tours
1997 concert tours